Anameristes is a genus of moths belonging to the subfamily Olethreutinae of the family Tortricidae.

Species
Anameristes cyclopleura (Turner, 1916)
Anameristes doryphora (Liu & Bai, 1986)

See also
List of Tortricidae genera

References

 , 2005: World Catalogue of Insects vol. 5 Tortricidae.
 , 1965: A revision of the Australian Tortricini, Schoeotenini, and Chlidanotini, (Lepidoptera: Tortricidae: Tortricinae). Australian Journal of Zoology 13 (4): 613-726.
 , 1986: A study of the Chinese Eboda Walker (Lepidoptera: Tortricidae). Sinozoologia 4: 151-154.

External links
tortricidae.com

Tortricini
Tortricidae genera